Dickey Albert Nutt (born June 13, 1959) is an assistant coach for the University of Missouri men's basketball team. His most recent head coaching position was at Southeast Missouri State University before being let go after the 2014-15 season. Born in Little Rock, Arkansas, he became the head coach of Arkansas State University in 1995 and resigned on February 19, 2008, ending his thirteen years as head coach just 3 victories short of the all-time win record for the school. In June 2007, Nutt had said that his future with the school was uncertain after receiving a one-year contract with the school.

Nutt had been coaching at Arkansas State since 1987, when he started as an assistant at the university.  Prior to that, he had spent two years as an assistant coach at Oklahoma State. He led the Indians, now the Red Wolves, to the NCAA tournament once, winning the Sun Belt Conference tournament to secure the conference's automatic bid in 1999.  Arkansas State received a 15 seed, and was eliminated by Utah in the first round.

Nutt played collegiately at Oklahoma State from 1977 to 1982.  After graduating, he began his coaching career in the high school ranks as an assistant coach at Stillwater High School in Oklahoma.

In March 2009, Nutt was named as the head basketball coach at Southeast Missouri State University.

On March 23, 2015, Nutt was relieved of his duties with the Redhawks. On July 7, 2015, Nutt joined the staff of Leonard Hamilton at Florida State.

On June 20, 2018, Nutt joined Corey Williams' staff at Stetson University as assistant coach.

On August 8, 2019, Nutt was named a special assistant coach on Dennis Gates' staff at Cleveland State University. On April 14, 2022, Nutt was hired as an assistant coach by Gates at the University of Missouri.

Family
Nutt's brother, Houston Nutt, was the head football coach at the University of Mississippi and University of Arkansas. Another brother, Dennis Nutt, was previously head coach for Texas State University and a former professional basketball player.

Nutt has three children, two sons and a daughter. His oldest son Logan played basketball for Ole Miss before transferring to Southeast Missouri State in December 2009 joining his younger brother, Lucas, who played for his father at Southeast Missouri State through 2014.

Head coaching record

* Nutt resigned on February 19, 2008.

References

1959 births
Living people
American men's basketball coaches
American men's basketball players
Arkansas State Red Wolves men's basketball coaches
Basketball coaches from Arkansas
Basketball players from Arkansas
College men's basketball head coaches in the United States
High school basketball coaches in the United States
Little Rock Central High School alumni
Oklahoma State Cowboys basketball coaches
Oklahoma State Cowboys basketball players
Southeast Missouri State Redhawks men's basketball coaches
Sportspeople from Little Rock, Arkansas